The 1840 Democratic National Convention was held in Baltimore, Maryland, from May 5 to May 6. The Democratic Party re-nominated President Martin Van Buren, but failed to select a nominee for vice president. Van Buren is the only major party presidential nominee since the ratification of the 12th Amendment to seek election without a running mate. Dragged down by the unpopularity of the Panic of 1837, Van Buren was defeated by the Whig Party's ticket in the 1840 presidential election.

Delegates

Delegates from 21 of 26 states were in attendance. States not in attendance were Connecticut, Delaware, Illinois, South Carolina and Virginia.

Platform

The 1840 convention was the first at which the party adopted a platform. Delegates reaffirmed their belief that the Constitution was the primary guide for each state's political affairs. To them, this meant that all roles of the federal government not specifically defined fell to each respective state government, including such responsibilities as debt created by local projects. Decentralized power and states' rights pervaded each and every resolution adopted at the convention, including those on slavery, taxes, and the possibility of a central bank. Regarding slavery, the Convention adopted the following resolution:Resolved, That congress has no power under the Constitution, to interfere with or control the domestic institutions of the several states, and that such states are the sole and proper judges of every thing appertaining to their own affairs, not prohibited by the Constitution: that all efforts of the abolitionists or others, made to induce congress to interfere with questions of slavery, or to take incipient steps in relation thereto, are calculated to lead to the most alarming and dangerous consequences, and that all such efforts have an inevitable tendency to diminish the happiness of the people, and endanger the stability and permanency of the Union, and ought not to be countenanced by any friend to our political institutions.

Vice Presidential nomination

Vice President Richard M. Johnson was not retained on the ticket, as he was largely seen as a liability in the 1836 election and had focused much of his time as vice president on his own economic affairs. Former president Andrew Jackson backed James K. Polk for the position of vice president, but Van Buren supported his vice president's renomination. The convention ultimately failed to nominate a running mate for Van Buren. Van Buren remains the only major party presidential nominee since the passage of the 12th Amendment to seek election without a running mate. Polk and Johnson would both receive electoral votes for vice president in the general election.

See also
History of the United States Democratic Party
1839 Whig National Convention
1840 United States presidential election
U.S. presidential nomination convention
List of Democratic National Conventions

References

External links
Democratic Party Platform of 1840 at The American Presidency Project

1840 conferences
1840 United States presidential election
1840 in Maryland
19th century in Baltimore
Political conventions in Baltimore
Maryland Democratic Party
Political events in Maryland
Democratic National Conventions
May 1840 events